Exfoliating granite is a granite undergoing exfoliation, or onion skin weathering (desquamation). The external delaminated layers of granite are gradually produced by the cyclic variations of temperature at the surface of the rock in a process also called spalling. Frost and ice expansion in the joints during the winter accelerate the alteration process while the most unstable loosen external layers are removed by gravity assisted by runoff water.

Geology 
Homogeneous granitic plutons are created in high-pressure environments and slowly solidify beneath the earth's crust. Vertical compression of overburden releases through erosion, or removal of overlying rocks resulting in unloading. Other contributors of unloading are tectonic uplift, glacier retreat, and mass wasting. The pressure is relieved when the granite is exposed at the surface, allowing it to expand towards the atmosphere.

On the surface, if the granite is not jointed, or if it has few joints, then the exposed surface usually expands faster than the underlying granite. The surface layer, often a couple hundred feet thick, separates from the underlying granite along an expansion joint to form a shell. As this continues, several concentric shells may form to depths of  feet or more. Concentric slabs/shells of rock begin to break loose, onion-like layers subparallel to the exterior called exfoliating, sheet jointing, or fractures. As the granite expands the outer, most shells become susceptible to weathering by water pressure, freeze/thaw cycles, and functioning vegetation is a process called physical weathering. The sheets of granite are large enough to shave off sharp edges on the granite's surface creating a dome shape. The overall activity creates exfoliation domes.

Dangers

Rock Falls 
Exfoliating rock can trigger rockfall.  Rock Falls in Yosemite National Park are common and pose threats to visitors. United States Geological Survey (USGS) conducted a study over a three-year period monitoring granite cracks within the park's Valley. Data collected by Park Geologist Greg Stock, and USGS civil engineer Brian Collins using deformation and temperature gauges. They concluded that there is an outward expansion with the change in thermal temperature up to an inch. With prolonged movement, the cracks expand over time and create exfoliation.

Infrastructure Failure 
Twain Harte Lake Dam is in Tuolumne County located within the Sierra Nevada Mountain Range. Engineers began construction on the dam in 1928 and placed the structure between two granite domes. In August 2014, the granite developed exfoliating joints and began to leak. The process was captured on video and is one of a couple ever to be caught on film. The lake was completely drained and the cost of reconstruction nine-hundred thousand dollars. In June 2016, the granite rock had to be closed off for a second time because of the continued exfoliation.

Historic Discovery  
Grove Karl Gilbert is considered one of the most influential geologists of his generation. He was the only president of the Geographic Society to receive the highest honor for geographic accomplishment; Hubbard Medal. Working his way down the Great Basin, Gilbert knew the general formation of mountains through a tectonic process, and are composed of different rock types. He observed that the mountain ranges in this area contained similarities in strata, resembling bubbles and blisters on the earth's surface. He concluded that the mountains were once intrusive magma that had and became visible with erosion. Gilbert presented his findings in a report and contributed significantly in what future generations would know as Geomorphology.

Examples

 Cannon Mountain in the White Mountains of New Hampshire
 Enchanted Rock in Texas
 Half Dome, also in Yosemite
 Royal Arch in Yosemite National Park

Characteristics of Exfoliating Granite

 Discontinuity (geotechnical engineering)
 Erosion surface
 Foliation (geology)
 Geography of the Yosemite area
 Granite dome
 Joint (geology)
 Spall
 Spheroidal weathering
 Chemical weathering occurs in granite exfoliation by changing the mineral composition. 
 Mechanical Weathering is the breakdown of rocks into smaller fragments or pieces.

References

External links and references

 A nice photo
 Another photo
 Exfoliating granite spires, Granite Mts, May 2007 Exfoliating granite spires, Granite Mountains
 Exfoliating granite, Mount Kinabalu, Sabah, Borneo
 One photo, from the Sierra Nevada
 One explanation on Youtube
 Another Youtube
 Petersen, James F., Dorthy Sack, and Robert E. Gabler. "Pg. 292." Fundamentals of Physical Geography. 1st ed. Belmont: Brooks/Cole, 2010. 292–93. Print.